Thallium hydroxide may refer to:

Thallium(I) hydroxide
Thallium(III) hydroxide

Thallium compounds
Hydroxides